The Holocaust in Lithuania resulted in the near total destruction of Lithuanian (Litvaks) and Polish Jews, living in Generalbezirk Litauen of Reichskommissariat Ostland within the Nazi-controlled Lithuanian SSR. Out of approximately 208,000–210,000 Jews, an estimated 190,000–195,000 were murdered before the end of World War II, most between June and December 1941. More than 95% of Lithuania's Jewish population was massacred over the three-year German occupationa more complete destruction than befell any other country affected by the Holocaust. Historians attribute this to the massive collaboration in the genocide by the non-Jewish local paramilitaries, though the reasons for this collaboration are still debated. The Holocaust resulted in the largest-ever loss of life in so short a period of time in the history of Lithuania.

The events that took place in the western regions of the USSR occupied by Nazi Germany in the first weeks after the German invasion, including Lithuania, marked the sharp intensification of the Holocaust.

An important component to the Holocaust in Lithuania was that the occupying Nazi German administration fanned antisemitism by blaming the Soviet regime's recent annexation of Lithuania in June 1940, on the Jewish community. Another significant factor was the large extent to which the Nazis' design drew upon the physical organization, preparation and execution of their orders by local Lithuanian collaborators of the Nazi occupation regime.

As of 2020, the topic of the Holocaust in Lithuania and the role played by Lithuanians in the genocide, including several notable Lithuanian nationalists, remains controversial.

Background

After the German and Soviet invasion of September 1939, the Soviet Union signed a treaty with Lithuania on 10 October, handed over predominantly Polish and Jewish city of Wilno (renamed Vilna) to Lithuania, in exchange for military concessions, and subsequently annexed Lithuania in 1940 after an election. The German invasion of the Soviet Union, on 22 June 1941, came after a year of Soviet occupation which had culminated in mass deportations across the Baltics only a week before the German invasion. The Nazis were welcomed as liberators and received support from Lithuania's irregular militia against retreating Soviet forces. Many Lithuanians believed Germany would allow the re-establishment of the country's independence. In order to appease the Germans, some people expressed significant antisemitic sentiments. Nazi Germany, which had seized the Lithuanian territories in the first week of the offensive, used this situation to its advantage and indeed in the first days permitted a Lithuanian Provisional Government of the Lithuanian Activist Front to be established. For a brief period it appeared that the Germans were about to grant Lithuania significant autonomy, comparable with that given to Slovak Republic. However, after about a month, the more independently minded Lithuanian organizations were disbanded around August and September 1941, as the Germans seized more control.

Destruction of Jewry

Estimated number of victims
Prior to the German invasion, the population of Jews was estimated to be about 210,000, (the Lithuanian statistics department claims there were 208,000 Jews as of 1 January 1941). This estimate, based on the officially accounted for prewar emigration within the USSR (approx. 8,500), the number of escapees from the Kaunas and Vilnius Ghettos, (1,500–2,000), as well as the number of survivors in the concentration camps when they were liberated by the Red Army, (2,000–3,000), puts the number of Lithuanian Jews murdered in the Holocaust at 195,000 to 196,000. It is difficult to estimate the exact number of casualties of the Holocaust and the latter number cannot be final or indisputable. The numbers given by historians differ significantly ranging from 165,000 to 254,000, the higher number probably including non-Lithuanian Jews among other Reich (empirical) dissenters labeled as Jewish killed in Lithuania.

There were some interventions to rescue Jews. In the period 16 July – 3 August 1940 the Dutch Honorary Consul Jan Zwartendijk in Kaunas provided over 2,200 Jews with an official third destination to Curaçao, a Caribbean island and Dutch colony that required no entry visa, or Surinam (which, upon independence in 1975, became Suriname). There was also a Japanese government official, Chiune Sugihara, who served as vice consul for the Japanese Empire, also in Kaunas, Lithuania. During the Second World War, Sugihara helped some six thousand Jews flee Europe by issuing transit visas to them so that they could travel through Japanese territory, risking his job and his family's lives. The fleeing Jews were refugees from German-occupied Western Poland and Soviet-occupied Eastern Poland, as well as residents of Lithuania.

The Holocaust events
The Lithuanian port city of Klaipėda (Memel in German) had historically been a member of the German Hanseatic League, and had belonged to Germany and East Prussia prior to 1918. The city was semi-autonomous during the period of Lithuanian independence, and under League of Nations supervision. Approximately 8,000 Jews lived in Memel when it was absorbed into the Reich on March 15, 1939. Its Jewish residents were expelled, and most fled into Lithuania proper where most would be killed after the Axis invasion in June, 1941.

Chronologically, the genocide in Lithuania can be divided into three phases: phase 1. summer to the end of 1941; phase 2. December 1941 – March 1943; phase 3. April 1943 – mid-July 1944.

Most Lithuanian Jews perished in the first phase during the first months of the occupation and before the end of 1941. The Axis invasion of the USSR began on June 22, 1941 and coincided with the June Uprising in Lithuania. During the days prior to the German occupation of Lithuania the Lithuanian Activist Front attacked Soviet forces, seized power in several cities, spread anti-Semitic propaganda and carried out massacres of Lithuanian Jews and Poles. One notable massacre began on the night of 25–26 June when Algirdas Klimaitis ordered his 800 Lithuanian troops to begin the Kaunas pogrom. Franz Walter Stahlecker, the SS commanding officer of Einsatzgruppe A claimed that by 28 June 1941 3,800 people had been killed in Kaunas and a further 1,200 in surrounding towns in the region. Klimaitis' men destroyed several synagogues and about sixty Jewish houses. In the 1990s the number of victims claimed by Stahlecker were questioned and thought to have been probably exaggerated.

German death squads, Einsatzgruppen, followed the advance of the German army units in June 1941 and immediately began organizing the murder of Jews. The first recorded action of the Einsatzgruppen (Einsatzgruppe A) unit took place on June 22, 1941, in the border town of Gargždai (called Gorzdt in Yiddish and Garsden in German), which was one of the oldest Jewish settlements in the country and only 18 kilometres (11 mi) from Germany's recovered Memel. Approximately 800 Jews were shot that day in what is known as the Garsden Massacre. Approximately 100 non-Jewish Lithuanians were also executed, many for trying to aid Jews. About 80,000 Jews were killed by October and about 175,000 by the end of the year.

The majority of Jews in Lithuania were not required to live in ghettos nor sent to the Nazi concentration camps which at that time were just in the preliminary stages of operation. Instead they were shot in pits near their places of residence with the most infamous mass murders, such as the Kaunas massacre of October 29, 1941, taking place in the Ninth Fort near Kaunas and the Ponary Forest near Vilnius. By 1942 about 45,000 Jews survived, largely those who had been sent to ghettos and camps.

In the second phase, the Holocaust slowed, as Germans decided to use the Jews as forced labor to fuel the German war economy. In the third phase, the destruction of Jews was again given a high priority; it was in that phase that the remaining ghettos and camps were liquidated.

Two factors contributed to the rapid destruction of Lithuanian Jewry. The first was the significant support for the "de-Jewification" of Lithuania coming from the Lithuanian populace. The second was the German plan for early colonization of Lithuania – which shared a border with German East Prussia – in accordance with their Generalplan Ost; hence the high priority given to the extermination of the relatively small Lithuanian Jewish community.

Participation of local collaborators

Dina Porat the chief historian of Yad Vashem writes that "The Lithuanians showed [the Einsatzgruppen] how to murder women and children, and perhaps made them accustomed to it...Indeed, at the onset of the invasion the German units killed mostly men, while the Lithuanians killed unselectively."

The Nazi German administration directed and supported the organized killing of Lithuanian Jews. Local Lithuanian auxiliaries of the Nazi occupation regime carried out logistics for the preparation and execution of the murders under Nazi direction. Nazi SS Brigadeführer Franz Walter Stahlecker arrived in Kaunas on 25 June 1941 and gave agitation speeches in the city to instigate the murder of Jews. Initially this was in the former State Security Department building, but officials there refused to take any action. Later, he gave speeches in the city. In a report of October 15, Stahlecker wrote that they had succeeded in covering up their vanguard unit (Vorkommando) actions, and it was made to look like it was the initiative of the local population. Groups of partisans, civil units of nationalist-rightist anti-Soviet affiliation, initiated contact with the Germans as soon as they entered the Lithuanian territories.
A rogue unit of insurgents headed by Algirdas Klimaitis and encouraged by Germans from the Sicherheitspolizei and Sicherheitsdienst, started anti-Jewish pogroms in Kaunas (Kovno) on the night of 25–26 June 1941. Over a thousand Jews perished over the next few days in what was the first pogrom in Nazi-occupied Lithuania. Different sources give different figures, one being 1,500 and another 3,800, with additional victims in other towns of the region.

On 24 June 1941, the Lithuanian Security Police (Lietuvos saugumo policija), subordinate to Nazi Germany's Security Police and Nazi Germany's Criminal Police, was created. It would be involved in various actions against the Jews and other enemies of the Nazi regime. Nazi commanders filed reports purporting the "zeal" of the Lithuanian police battalions surpassed their own. The most notorious Lithuanian unit participating in the Holocaust was the Ypatingasis būrys (a subdivision of German SD) from the Vilnius (Vilna, Wilno) area which killed tens of thousands of Jews, Poles and others in the Ponary massacre. Another Lithuanian organization involved in the Holocaust was the Lithuanian Labor Guard. Many Lithuanian supporters of the Nazi policies came from the fascist Iron Wolf organization. Overall, the nationalistic Lithuanian administration was interested in the liquidation of the Jews as a perceived enemy and potential rivals of ethnic Lithuanians and thus not only did not oppose Nazi Holocaust policy but in effect adopted it as their own.

A combination of factors serves as an explanation for participation of some Lithuanians in genocide against Jews. Those factors include national traditions and values, including antisemitism, common throughout contemporary Central Europe, and a more Lithuanian-specific desire for a "pure" Lithuanian nation-state with which the Jewish population was believed to be incompatible. There were a number of additional factors, such as severe economic problems which led to the killing of Jews over personal property. Finally the Jews were seen as having supported the Soviet regime in Lithuania during 1940–1941. During the period leading up to the German invasion, the Jews were blamed by some for virtually every misfortune that had befallen Lithuania.

The involvement of the local population and institutions, in relatively high numbers, in the destruction of Lithuanian Jewry became a defining factor of the Holocaust in Lithuania.

Not all of the Lithuanian populace supported the killings, and many hundreds risked their lives sheltering the Jews. Israel has recognized 891 Lithuanians (as of January 1, 2017) as Righteous Among the Nations for risking their lives to save Jews during the Holocaust. In addition, many members of the Polish minority in Lithuania also helped to shelter the Jews. Lithuanians and Poles who risked their lives saving Jews were persecuted and often executed by the Nazis.

Comprehension and remembrance
Following the Holocaust, Lithuania became part of the USSR and the government tried to minimize the unique suffering of the Jews. In Lithuania and throughout the Soviet Union, memorials did not mention Jews in particular; instead they were built to commemorate the suffering of "local inhabitants". However, people guilty of Nazi collaboration and crimes against Jews were often deported or executed.

Since Lithuania regained independence from the Soviet Union in 1991, the debate over Lithuanian participation in the Holocaust has been fraught with difficulty. Modern Lithuanian nationalists stress anti-Soviet resistance, but some Lithuanian partisans, seen in Lithuania as heroes in the struggle against Soviet occupation, were also Nazi collaborators who had cooperated in the murder of Lithuanian Jewry.

The genocide in Lithuania is seen by some historians as one of the earliest large-scale implementations of the Final Solution, leading some scholars to express an opinion that the Holocaust began in Lithuania in the summer of 1941. Other scholars say the Holocaust started in September 1939 with the onset of the Second World War, or even earlier, on Kristallnacht in 1938, or with Hitler's rise to power as Chancellor of Germany in 1933.

The post-Soviet Lithuanian government has on a number of occasions commemorated the Holocaust, made attempts to combat antisemitism, and brought some Nazi-era war criminals to justice. The National Coalition Supporting Soviet Jewry have said "Lithuania has made slow but significant progress in the prosecution of suspected Lithuanian collaborators in the Nazi genocide". Lithuania was the first of the newly independent post-Soviet states to legislate for the protection and marking of Holocaust-related sites. In 1995, president of Lithuania Algirdas Brazauskas speaking before the Israeli Knesset, offered a public apology to the Jewish people for the Lithuanian participation in the Holocaust. On 20 September 2001, to mark the 60th anniversary of the Holocaust in Lithuania, the Seimas (Lithuanian parliament) held a session during which Alfonsas Eidintas, the historian nominated as the Republic's next ambassador to Israel, delivered an address accounting for the annihilation of Lithuania's Jews.

Controversy and criticism
There has been limited debate on the place of the Holocaust in Lithuanian national memory; historically Lithuanians have denied national participation in the Holocaust or labeled the Lithuanian participants in genocide as fringe extreme elements. The memories of that time and the discussion of those events in Jewish and Lithuanian historiographies are quite different, although Lithuanian historiography in the past two decades has improved, compared to the Soviet historiography, with the works of scholars such as Alfonsas Eidintas, Valentinas Brandišauskas and Arūnas Bubnys, among others, being positively reviewed by the Western and Jewish historians. The issue remains controversial to this day. According to Lithuanian historians, the contentious issues involve the role of the Lithuanian Activist Front, the Lithuanian Provisional Government and participation of Lithuanian civilians and volunteers in the Holocaust.

Since the 1990s there has been criticism of the Lithuanian government's efforts to accurately depict the history of the Holocaust, the continued praising of alleged Lithuanian nationalists who collaborated with the Nazis in murdering hundreds of thousands of Lithuanian Jews and the government's aversion to accepting culpability for the Holocaust in Lithuania. In 2010s Lithuanian society has been characterized by Holocaust dismissal and a recent surge in anti-Semitic sentiment.

In 2001 the Lithuanian government was criticized for its unwillingness to prosecute Lithuanians involved in the Holocaust by the Simon Wiesenthal Center. In 2002 the Center declared its dissatisfaction with the Lithuanian government's efforts and launched "Operation Last Chance", offering monetary rewards for evidence that leads to the prosecution of war criminals. This campaign has encountered much resistance in Lithuania and the other former Soviet bloc countries. In 2008, the Center which had initially ranked Lithuania high during on-going trials to bring Lithuanian war criminals to justice, noted, in its annual report, no progress and the lack of any real punishment by Lithuanian justice organs for Holocaust perpetrators.

In 2010 Klaipėda's court ruled that swastikas could be displayed publicly and were symbols of "Lithuania's historical heritage."

In January 2020 Lithuania's Prime Minister Saulius Skvernelis announced he will lead a committee to draft legislation declaring that neither Lithuania nor its leaders participated in the Holocaust. It is thought that the proposed law will likely be similar to the Polish Holocaust bill which makes it a crime to claim Poles or Polish authorities played any role in the Holocaust. In May 2020, on the 75th anniversary of end of World War II in Europe, the Lithuanian government sent its Vice Minister of Foreign Affairs, Povilas Poderskis to accompany the German, Israeli and American ambassadors in attending a ceremony at the Lithuanian Jewish Cemetery in Vilnius.

Vilnius Street renaming and memorial controversy
In 2019 the issue gained national political attention when Vilnius' liberal Freedom Party mayor, Remigijus Šimašius, renamed a street that had been named after Kazys Skirpa (who formed the Lithuanian Activist Front which went on to carry out massacres of Jews across Lithuania) and removed a memorial to Jonas Noreika (who ordered and oversaw the killings of Lithuanian Jews in Plungė during the Plungė massacre). The Lithuanian government-backed Genocide and Resistance Research Centre of Lithuania, which had previously been criticized for its whitewashing of the Holocaust, alleged that the plan to rename the streets was a plot by foreigners (mainly British and American). During the controversy Vytautas Landsbergis, Lithuania's first head of state after its independence from the Soviet Union, posted a poem on social media that referred to the Virgin Mary as a "žydelka" ("jew-girl") which was condemned by Faina Kukliansky, chair of the Jewish Community of Lithuania. Landsbergis said the poem was an attempt to show the ignorance of Lithuanian antisemites and requested support from "at least one smart and brave Jew ... who does not agree with Simasius." Lithuanian President Gitanas Nausėda subsequently proposed a law that would require municipalities to follow rules from the national government "when installing, removing or changing commemorative plaques" but later tabled the proposed law.

See also
Chiune Sugihara
Collaboration during World War II
History of the Jews in Lithuania
Lithuanian Territorial Defense Force (1944)
Lithuanian collaboration during World War II
Timeline of Jewish history in Lithuania
The Holocaust in Estonia
The Holocaust in Latvia

Notes

a  While this article discusses the Holocaust on the Lithuanian territories, which primarily affected and resulted in the destruction of Lithuanian Jewry, tens of thousands of non-Lithuanian Jews also died on Lithuanian territories. This included primarily: 1) Polish Jews who sought refuge in Lithuania escaping the invasion of Poland in 1939 and 2) Jews from various Western countries shipped to extermination sites in Lithuania.

b  Some scholars have noted that the German Final Solution and the Holocaust actually began in Lithuania. Dina Porat: "The Final Solution – the systematic overall physical extermination of Jewish communities one after the other – began in Lithuania. Konrad Kwiet: "Lithuanian Jews were among the first victims of the Holocaust [...] The Germans carried out the mass executions [...] signalling the beginning of the "Final Solution." See also, Konrad Kwiet, "The Onset of the Holocaust: The Massacres of Jews in Lithuania in June 1941." Annual lecture delivered as J. B. and Maurice Shapiro Senior Scholar-in-Residence at the United States Holocaust Memorial Museum on 4 December 1995. Published under the same title but expanded in Power, Conscience and Opposition: Essays in German History in Honour of John A Moses, ed. Andrew Bonnell et al. (New York: Peter Lang, 1996), pp. 107–21

c  Three major ghettos in Lithuania were established: Vilnius ghetto (with a population of about 20,000), Kaunas Ghetto (17,500) and the Shavli Ghetto (5,000); there were also a number of smaller ghettos and labor camps.

d  The propaganda line of Jewish Bolshevism was used intensively by Nazis in instigating antisemitic feelings among Lithuanians. It built upon the pre-invasion antisemitic propaganda of the anti-Soviet Lithuanian Activist Front which had seized upon the fact that more Jews than Lithuanians supported the Soviet regime. This had helped to create an entire mythos of Jewish culpability for the sufferings of Lithuania under the Soviet regime (and beyond). A LAF pamphlet read: "For the ideological maturation of the Lithuanian nation it is essential that anticommunist and anti-Jewish action be strengthened [...] It is very important that this opportunity be used to get rid of the Jews as well. We must create an atmosphere that is so stifling for the Jews that not a single Jew will think that he will have even the most minimal rights or possibility of life in the new Lithuania. Our goal is to drive out the Jews along with the Red Russians. [...] The hospitality extended to the Jews by Vytautas the Great is hereby revoked for all time because of their repeated betrayals of the Lithuanian nation to its oppressors." An extreme faction of the supporters of Augustinas Voldemaras, a group which also worked within the LAF, actually envisioned a racially exclusive "Aryan" Lithuanian state. With the start of German occupation, one of Kaunas' newspapers – Į Laisvę (Towards Freedom), commenced a spirited antisemitic crusade, reinforcing the identity of the Jew with communism in popular consciousness: "Jewry and Bolshevism are one, parts of an indivisible entity."

References

Further reading
 Bubnys, A. (2005). The Holocaust in Lithuania between 1941 and 1944. Genocide and Resistance Research Centre of Lithuania.
 Cassedy, E. (2012). We Are Here: Memories of the Lithuanian Holocaust (Illustrated ed.). University of Nebraska Press.
 Eidintas, A. (2003). Jews, Lithuanians and the Holocaust, Versus Aureus.
 Eidintas, A. A "Jew-Communist" Stereotype in Lithuania, 1940–1941. Lithuanian Political Science Yearbook (01/2000), 1–36.
 Gordon, H. (2000). The Shadow of Death: The Holocaust in Lithuania, University Press of Kentucky.
 Greenbaum, M. (2018). The Jews of Lithuania: A History of a Remarkable Community 1316–1945. Gefen Publishing House.
 Issrof, S. (2002). The Holocaust in Lithuania, 1941–1945: A Book of Remembrance (3 vols.). (R. L. Cohen, Ed.). Gefen Books.
 
 Levin, D. (1993). Lithuanian Attitudes toward the Jewish Minority in the Aftermath of the Holocaust: The Lithuanian Press, 1991–1992, Holocaust and Genocide Studies, 7(2), 247–262. 
 Levin, D. (1990). On the Relations between the Baltic Peoples and their Jewish Neighbors before, during and after World War II, Holocaust and Genocide Studies, 5(1), 53–56. 
 Senn, A. E. (2007). Lithuania 1940: Revolution from Above. Rodopi.
 Sepetys, R. (2011). Between Shades of Gray (Illustrated edition). Philomel Books.
 Stasiulis, S. (2020). The Holocaust in Lithuania: The Key Characteristics of Its History, and the Key Issues in Historiography and Cultural Memory. East European Politics and Societies, 34(1), 261–279. 
 Tumasonis, R., & Levinson, J. (2006). The Shoah (Holocaust) in Lithuania. VAGA Publishers.
 Vanagaite, Ruta, Zuroff, Efraim. (2020). Our People: Discovering Lithuania's Hidden Holocaust. Rowman & Littlefield.
 Weeks, T. R. (2015). Vilnius between Nations, 1795–2000. Northern Illinois University Press.

External links
Lithuanian Holocaust Atlas – Vilna Gaon State Jewish Museum, Lithuania
United States Holocaust Memorial Museum, Holocaust Encyclopedia: Lithuania
The Genocide and Resistance Research Centre of Lithuania
Memorial to Murdered Jews of Lithuania (w/ photos of the memorial)
Atamukas, Solomonas. (2001), The hard long road toward the truth: on the sixtieth anniversary of the holocaust in Lithuania. in Lithuanus/Lithuanian Quarterly Journal of Arts and Sciences, vol. 47, 4.
Kulikauskas, Andrius. (2015), How did Lithuanians wrong Litvaks?
Holocaust In The Baltics Information and updates on the ongoing debate, edited by Dovid Katz
The Holocaust in Lithuania 
German soldiers and Lithuanians watch a "partisan" murder Jewish men at the Lietukis garage, Kovno, June 27, 1941.
Chronicles of the Vilna Ghetto 
Lietukis Garage Massacre in Kaunas (27 June 1941)
Lithuanian militiamen in Kovno round up Jews during an early pogrom. Kovno, Lithuania, June 25–July 8, 1941.
Kovno, Lithuania, Jews who were murdered by Lithuanian nationalists...
District of Kaunas / Kovno
Lithuanian Testimonies’ Project 
Jewish children on the streets of the Kovno ghetto. Lithuania, 1941–1943
Association of Lithuanian Jews in Israel
Как литовцы евреев убивали
Центр исследования геноцида и резистенции жителей Литвы
Double Genocide: Lithuania wants to erase its ugly history of Nazi collaboration
The Holocaust in Lithuania, and Its Obfuscation, in Lithuanian Sources
 Kulikauskas, Andrius. Documents Which Argue for Ethnic Cleansing (by Kazys Škirpa, Stasys Raštikis, Stasys Lozoraitis and Petras Klimas in 1940–1941 and by Birutė Teresė Burauskaitė in 2015)
 [Vytautas Tininis. The concept of "collaboration" in the context of Lithuanian history http://www.genocid.lt/Leidyba/9/vytautas.htm]; Lietuvos gyventojų genocido ir rezistencijos tyrimo centras.